State Route 137 (SR-137) is a  state highway in the state of Utah that connects the town of Mayfield with the city of Gunnison and U.S. Route 89 (US-89) in rural Sanpete County.

Route description

State Route 137 is configured as a loop of US-89, with a short southern spur to service the center of Mayfield. It begins in Gunnison as 600 S at its intersection with Main Street (US-89), and travels eastward, turning southeast towards Mayfield as it passes the end of a mountain range.

History
State Route 137 was established in 1933 as the road "from Route 89 southerly to Mayfield thence westerly to route 89 at Gunnison". The route has remained essentially unchanged since then, as its current description reads "From Route 89 in Gunnison easterly to Mayfield; then northerly to Route 89".

Major intersections

References

137
 137